Fawdington is a hamlet and civil parish in the Hambleton district of North Yorkshire, England. The population of the parish was estimated at 10 in 2015. The population remained at less than 100 at the 2011 Census. Details were included in the old civil parish of Brafferton, North Yorkshire.

The name of the hamlet is generally agreed to derive from a mixture of Old English and Old Norse, with the suffix tūn meaning town. However the first part is in dispute; Ekwall states that it derives from the Old English Falding, meaning the place where animals were folded (brought into a fold), whereas the English Place-Name Society states that it is from Falda, a personal name.

References

External links 

Villages in North Yorkshire
Civil parishes in North Yorkshire